Sam Swainsbury is an English actor, known for his roles as Jason in the BBC sitcom Mum and Rowan in the 2019 film Fisherman's Friends.

Career
In 2013, Swainsbury featured on the film Thor: The Dark World, he played a Stonehenge TV News Reporter. From 2016 to 2019, he starred in the BBC sitcom Mum, as Jason. In 2017, Swainsbury appeared on Fearless, a six-part British crime thriller drama series, he played Kevin Russell, a 37-year-old man who insists he was wrongly imprisoned for 14 years for the murder of Linda Simms. In 2019, he appeared in an episode of the ITV drama Victoria as Dr John Snow.

Filmography

Film

Television

Awards and nominations

References

External links
 

Living people
English male film actors
English male television actors
Year of birth missing (living people)